Aldrich Bowker (January 1, 1875 – March 21, 1947) was an American stage and film actor.

Biography
Bowker was born in Ashby, Massachusetts. He graduated from Fitchburg High School. His debut came in Boston in a stage adaptation of The Christian, by Hall Caine.

He was a long-time stage performer in Chicago and Cincinnati, and in summer stock at amusement park Whalom Park in Lunenburg, Massachusetts. Bowker was a pioneer in "open air" theatre at Whalom Park and at his summer home in Ashburnham, where other performers were frequent guests, including Ainsworth Arnold and Bette Davis.

Between 1912 and 1938 he was active on Broadway. Notable stage plays he performed in were The High Road (1912), A Night in Avignon (1919), You Can't Take It With You (1936) and 200 Were Chosen (1936).

Between 1939 and 1942 he appeared in about 25 films, including Ball of Fire (1941).

Bowker died at Patton State Hospital in San Bernardino, California, from arteriosclerosis and senility.

Partial filmography

 Nancy Drew... Trouble Shooter (1939) as Matt Brandon
 Waterfront (1939) as Father Dunn
 Torchy Blane... Playing with Dynamite (1939) as Judge Hershey
 These Glamour Girls (1939) as Charlie, the Counterman (uncredited)
 Everybody's Hobby (1939) as Uncle Bert Leslie
 Angels Wash Their Faces (1939) as Turnkey
 No Place to Go (1939) as Heffernan
 Pride of the Blue Grass (1939) as Judge
 On Dress Parade (1939) as Father Ryan
 Joe and Ethel Turp Call on the President (1939) as Mike O'Brien
 Abe Lincoln in Illinois (1940) as Judge Bowling Green
 It All Came True (1940) as Father McDuffy (uncredited)
 Those Were the Days! (1940) as Judge Squire Jennings
 Susan and God (1940) as Patrick
 Jennie (1940) as Dr. Hildebrand
 Romance of the Rio Grande (1940) as Padre Martinez
 Meet John Doe (1941) as Pop Dwyer (uncredited)
 Pot o' Gold (1941) as Judge Mike Murray (uncredited)
 The Wagons Roll at Night (1941) as Mr. Williams
 Love Crazy (1941) as Jimmy, the Doorman (uncredited)
 Ball of Fire (1941) as Justice of the Peace
 I Was Framed (1942) as Dr. Phillip Black
 Mississippi Gambler (1942) as Judd Higgins, Mississippi Newspaper Editor
 The Major and the Minor (1942) as Reverend Doyle
 I Married a Witch (1942) as Justice of the Peace (final film role)

References

External links
 
 

1875 births
1947 deaths
American male stage actors
American male film actors
Male actors from Massachusetts
20th-century American male actors